John Randall may refer to:

John Randall (Annapolis mayor) (1750–1826), mayor of Annapolis, Maryland and colonel in the American Revolution
Sir John Randall (physicist) (1905–1984), British physicist, developer of the cavity magnetron
John Randall, Baron Randall of Uxbridge (born 1955),  British Conservative Party politician, former MP for Uxbridge and South Ruislip
John A. Randall (1881–1968), President of the Rochester Institute of Technology
John Randall (organist) (1715–1799), Professor of Music, Cambridge University
John Ernest Randall (1924–2020), American ichthyologist, former director of the Oceanic Institute in Hawaii
John Herman Randall, Jr. (1899–1980), American philosopher, author and educator
John Witt Randall (1813–1892), American zoologist and poet 
John Randall (politician) (died 1869), American politician 
John Randall (Puritan) (1570–1622), English puritan divine
John Randall (public servant), President of the National Union of Students, 1973–1975
John Randall (shipbuilder) (1755–1802), English dockyard owner

See also
Jack Randall (disambiguation)
Jon Randall (born 1969), American country musician